Amoria diamantina is a species of sea snail, a marine gastropod mollusk in the family Volutidae, the volutes.

Description
The length of the shell varies between 40 mm and 80 mm.

Distribution
This marine species occurs off Western Australia.

References

 Bail P. & Limpus A. (2001) The genus Amoriae. In: G.T. Poppe & K. Groh (eds) A conchological iconography. Hackenheim: Conchbooks. 50 pp., 93 pls

Volutidae
Gastropods described in 1972